The Passenger is a 2005 French drama film directed by Éric Caravaca.

Cast 
 Éric Caravaca - Thomas
 Julie Depardieu - Jeanne
 Vincent Rottiers - Lucas
 Maurice Bénichou - Joseph
 Maurice Garrel - Gilbert
 Nathalie Richard - Suzanne
  - Richard
  - Richard jeune

References

External links 

2005 drama films
2005 films
French drama films
2000s French films